Yahya Ahmad (born 7 August 1954) is a Malaysian former cyclist. He competed in the individual road race event at the 1976 Summer Olympics.

References

External links
 

1954 births
Living people
Malaysian male cyclists
Olympic cyclists of Malaysia
Cyclists at the 1976 Summer Olympics
Place of birth missing (living people)
Cyclists at the 1978 Asian Games
Asian Games competitors for Malaysia
20th-century Malaysian people
21st-century Malaysian people